Paul Thomas Mirabella (born March 20, 1954) is an American former professional baseball pitcher. Mirabella, who threw left-handed, played all or parts of 13 seasons in Major League Baseball for the Texas Rangers (1978 and 1982), New York Yankees (1979), Toronto Blue Jays (1980–81), Baltimore Orioles (1983), Seattle Mariners (1984–86) and Milwaukee Brewers (1987–90).

Career
Mirabella attended Parsippany High School in Parsippany-Troy Hills, New Jersey, then went on to Montclair State University.

Mirabella had a 19–29 win–loss record with a 4.45 earned run average. He appeared in 298 games, including 33 as a starting pitcher, 3 of which were complete games, including 1 shutout. As a relief pitcher, he finished 88 games, compiling 13 saves. Overall, he pitched 499.2 innings, facing 2,236 batters, striking out 258. He allowed 526 hits, 284 runs (247 earned), 43 home runs, 239 walks (29 intentional), 13 hit batsmen, 17 wild pitches and 1 balk.

References

External links
, or Baseball Gauge, or Retrosheet, or Venezuelan Professional Baseball League

1954 births
Living people
American expatriate baseball players in Canada
Asheville Tourists players
Baltimore Orioles players
Baseball players from New Jersey
Beloit Brewers players
Calgary Cannons players
Columbus Clippers players
Denver Zephyrs players
Leones del Caracas players
American expatriate baseball players in Venezuela
Major League Baseball pitchers
Milwaukee Brewers players
Montclair State Red Hawks baseball players
Montclair State University alumni
New York Yankees players
Parsippany High School alumni
People from Belleville, New Jersey
People from Parsippany-Troy Hills, New Jersey
Portland Beavers players
Rochester Red Wings players
Seattle Mariners players
Sportspeople from Morris County, New Jersey
Syracuse Chiefs players
Texas Rangers players
Toronto Blue Jays players
Tucson Toros players
Tulsa Drillers players
West Palm Beach Tropics players